Children of the Century is a 1999 French film based on the true tale of the tumultuous love affair between two French literary icons of the 19th century, novelist George Sand (Juliette Binoche) and poet Alfred de Musset (Benoît Magimel).

Plot summary

The story begins as George Sand quits her marital home and arrives in Paris with her two children. Meanwhile, the young poet and dandy Alfred de Musset is busy making a name for himself both as a womaniser and a talented poet and critic. Sand and Musset first meet at a literary dinner and quickly recognise in each other a like-minded love of literature. At first their relationship remains platonic, but soon the pair embark on a tumultuous affair that will lead them to Venice and the creation of their finest works of literature.

Background and production
The film was shot on location in Paris, Nohant and Venice from August to December 1998. In an interview with The Irish Times entitled "Playing with Sand", Diane Kurys revealed that she was shooting in the actual rooms Sand and Musset had occupied in the Hotel Danieli, while Juliette Binoche revealed that Sand's estate had loaned the production some of her possessions including a sapphire ring and jewel-encrusted dagger. When asked about her inspiration for the film, Kurys mentioned that Musset's account of the affair in his book La Confession d'un Enfant du Siècle was her starting point. Binoche said that her attraction to the part was due to "Sand's combination of strengths and weaknesses".

Cast 
 Juliette Binoche : George Sand
 Benoît Magimel : Alfred de Musset
 Robin Renucci : François Buloz
 Stefano Dionisi : Pietro Pagello
 Karin Viard : Marie Dorval
 Denis Podalydès : Charles-Augustin Sainte-Beuve
 Isabelle Carré : Aimée d'Alton
 Patrick Chesnais : Gustave Planche
 Olivier Foubert : Paul de Musset
 Marie-France Mignal : Madame de Musset
 Ludivine Sagnier : Hermine de Musset
 Robert Plagnol : Jules Sandeau
 Michel Robin : Larive
 Mathias Mégard : Eugène Delacroix
 Arnaud Giovaninetti : Alfred Tattet 
 Pascal Ternisien : Boucoiran
 Victoire Thivisol : Solange
 Julien Léal : Maurice
 Jean-Claude de Goros : Capo de Feuillide

Premiere
Les Enfants du Siècle made its world premiere out of competition at the 1999 Cannes Film Festival before being released in French theatres on September 22, 1999.

The film made its North American debut at the 1999 Toronto International Film Festival.

The film made its UK debut as part of the Martell French Film Tour in September and October 2000, followed by a conventional cinematic run starting on April 6, 2001.

Film festivals
 Cannes Film Festival 1999 (out of competition - special gala screening)
 Toronto International Film Festival 1999
 Algerian Summer Film Festival 2000
 Budapest French Film Festival 2000
 Moscow French Film Festival 2000
 Martell French Film Tour 2000 (UK)
 Dublin French Film Festival 2001
 Warsaw French Film Festival 2001

Soundtrack
The soundtrack album to accompany the film was released by Decca Classics. The original music featured in the film consisting of a guitar and piano score was composed by Luis Bacalov. The film also features music by Ernst Eichner, Robert Schumann, Franz Liszt among others. The score was recorded in January 1999 by the Rome Symphony Orchestra and featuring Fábio Zanon on guitar and Leonid Kuzmin on piano. The album was supervised by Murray Head.

Track listing
All tracks composed by Luis Bacalov unless otherwise indicated:
 Les Enfants du Siècle (Guitar) (02:23)
 Les Confessions (02:57)
 Café Tortoni (02:30)
 La flûte désenchantée (01:54)
 Concerto in C major for harp and orchestra : Allegro (04:54) (Ernst Eichner 1740-1777)
 Arabeske in C, Op. 18 : IV Zum Schluss (01:24) (Robert Schumann)
 Le baiser (02:29)
 Le cœur qui bat (02:16)
 Papillons (01:16)
 La première fois (05:50)
 Beatrice di Tenda, opera seria in due atti (04:47) (Vincenzo Bellini)
 Désespoir (02:05)
 La guérison (02:16)
 Le Bal (02:51)
 Der Müller und der Bach (05:53) (Franz Liszt)
 Romanze (Piuttosto lento) (02:22) (Robert Schumann)
 Chez Delacroix (01:34)
 Le cheval mort (02:31)
 L'amour en fuite (02:30)
 Les Enfants du Siècle (Piano) (02:11)

Alternate versions
The film was released in 2 versions with different running times. The long version as released in France on September 22, 1999 has a running time of 135 mins. It begins as Sand abandons her husband and arrives in revolution torn Paris and Musset's father dies of cholera. A shorter version was released in Germany and the UK and other territories which runs at 105mins. It begins at the literary event at which Sand and Musset met and ends with their final meeting. The longer version goes on to show Sand's attempts to see the dying Musset, and ends with her reading her letters to him by his tomb.

Les Enfants du Siècle was released under the English-language title Children of the Century in the US by Koch Lorber Films, but retained its French-Language title while on release in the UK, Canada and Australia. The film was distributed in the UK by Film Four, in Canada by Alliance Atlantis and in Australia by AE Classics.

Books
Two books were published in conjunction with the film. Les Enfants du Siecle is a novelization of the screenplay by François-Olivier Rousseau. Sand & Musset is a large format coffee-table book exploring the history of Sand and Musset and the production of the film, co-written by Jean-Pierre Guéno, Roselyne de Ayala, and Diane Kurys, with lavish illustrations by Maxime Rebiere.

References

External links
 
 
 Film Four - UK Distributor
 BBC Films Review (UK)
 Film Review (UK)
 British Film Institute listing

1999 films
1999 romantic drama films
Romance films based on actual events
Films directed by Diane Kurys
Films produced by Alain Sarde
Cultural depictions of George Sand
French romantic drama films
Biographical films about writers
1990s French films